ATL's Finest is the debut solo studio album by American rapper J-Bo of Atlanta-based hip hop duo YoungBloodZ. It was released on April 15, 2008 via Real Talk Entertainment.

Track listing

Charts

References

External links
ATL's Finest by J-Bo at AllMusic
ATL's Finest by J-Bo at Discogs

J-Bo albums
2008 debut albums
Real Talk Entertainment albums
Crunk albums
Albums produced by Big Hollis